Heterodactylus septentrionalis is a species of lizard in the family Gymnophthalmidae. It is endemic to Brazil.

References

Heterodactylus
Reptiles of Brazil
Endemic fauna of Brazil
Reptiles described in 2009
Taxa named by Miguel Trefaut Rodrigues
Taxa named by Marco A. de Freitas
Taxa named by Thais F. Santos Silva